Roger Dingledine is an American computer scientist known for having co-founded the Tor Project. A student of mathematics, computer science, and electrical engineering, Dingledine is also known by the pseudonym arma. As of December 2016, he continues in a leadership role with the Tor Project, as a project Leader, Director, and Research Director. His father, Raymond Dingledine, is a professor in Emory School of Medicine.

Education
Dingledine graduated from MIT with Bachelor of Science degrees in Mathematics and Computer Science in 2000. Then he obtained Master of Engineering in Electrical Engineering and Computer Science from MIT.

Career

Tor Project
Tor was developed by Dingledine—with Nick Mathewson and Paul Syverson—under a contract from the United States Naval Research Laboratory. As of 2006, the software they developed was being distributed using proceeds from the Electronic Frontier Foundation, by the Tor Project. As described at the end of 2015,

 as well as developing and maintaining other software tools and applications. As of December 2016, Dingledine continues in a leadership role with the Tor project, as a Project Leader, Director, and Research Director. Isabela Bagueros acts as the Tor project's Executive Director. She took over this role in January 2019, having previously been a Project Manager at the Tor project since 2015.

Publications and presentations 
Dingledine has written several highly cited papers, including the Tor design paper titled Tor: The Second-Generation Onion Router, which won the Usenix Security "Test of Time" award.  Other highly cited papers include Mixminion’s protocols for anonymous email, 
the Free Haven Project distributed anonymous storage service, various attacks and vulnerabilities related to anonymity technologies, and the economics and network effects of technologies for anonymity.

As an advocate for strong privacy, Dingledine is frequently invited to speak about security and privacy, including at academic conferences, the NSF (2014), the NSA (2007), and periodic interviews.

Awards and honors
Dingledine was named as one of the 2006 thirty-five Innovators Under 35 by MIT Technology Review, for his work on internet anonymization technologies through the Tor Project. The Review described the importance of the work in this way:

In 2012, Dingledine and the other two initial developers of Tor, Nick Mathewson and Paul Syverson, were recognized by Foreign Policy magazine as #78 in their top 100 global thinkers.

Media attention
Dingledine has drawn attention after the leak of NSA documents by Edward Snowden, and public disclosure of the rules guiding the operation of XKeyscore, the NSA's collection system, given XKeyscore's targeting of Tor Project onion servers, including the one Dingledine runs at MIT, which serves a directory authority for the system, as well as being the base of operation of the Mixminion mail service, and host to various gaming and other websites (from which the NSA might be collecting IP addresses).

Further reading

References

Massachusetts Institute of Technology alumni
American computer scientists
Year of birth missing (living people)
Living people
Tor (anonymity network)
Free software programmers